Emulation may refer to: 
Emulation (computing), imitation of behavior of a computer or other electronic system with the help of another type of system
Video game console emulator, software which emulators video game consoles
Gaussian process emulator, a special case of the Gaussian process in statistics
Surrogate model, a model which imitates or emulates a more complicated (usually in terms of computer simulation time) model.

ASC Emulation, a football club in Martinique
Emulation (observational learning), a theory of comparative psychology
Emulation Lodge of Improvement, a masonic lodge whose aim is to preserve masonic ritual as closely as is possible to that which was formally accepted
Socialist emulation, a form of competition that was practiced in the Soviet Union
Whole brain emulation, aiming at mind uploading

See also
ST Emulous, a British tugboat
Semulation, a mix of software simulation and hardware emulation of an electronic system